The Interceltic Festival of Morrazo is a folk music festival celebrated in August in Moaña in Galicia, Spain. The purpose of the festival is to promote and develop traditional folk music, highlinting Celtic music and new tendencies. The festival was founded on 15 August 1985 by the Semente Nova Bigpipes' School.

See also 
 Galician traditional music

External links 
 Official website

Music festivals in Spain
Celtic music festivals
Folk festivals in Spain